Hedwig William Rego (born 16 October 1937) is a teacher, social activist and a former nominated Anglo-Indian member of the 11th Lok Sabha (1997).

Early life
Hedwig was born on 16 October 1937, to William Anthony Michael of Hyderabad, Andhra Pradesh. She received her education from Shivaji University of Kolhapur and Annamalai University, Chennai and holds Master of Arts and Bachelor of Education degrees.

Career
From 1977 to 1997, Rego was a senior teacher at The Frank Anthony Public School, Bangalore. In 1997, she was nominated to the Lok Sabha, lower house of the Indian parliament, for one of the two seats reserved for Anglo-Indians. As a Lok Sabha member she raised issues related to the Anglo-Indian community.

Rego has served on the Minorities Commission of Karnataka state. She is also involved with Anglo-Indian institutions like Archdiocesan Board of Education, Bangalore and Anglo-Indian Guild.

Personal life
She married Denzil Rego on 3 June 1963. Together they have two daughters and three sons and live in Bangalore. Rego is a breast cancer survivor and has been a counsellor for a cancer awareness program in her city.

References

1937 births
Living people
Anglo-Indian people
Politicians from Hyderabad, India
Shivaji University alumni
Annamalai University alumni
India MPs 1996–1997
Women members of the Lok Sabha
Indian schoolteachers
Nominated members of the Lok Sabha